Sir Charles William Rouse Boughton (December 1747 – 26 February 1821) was an administrator in India with the East India Company and subsequently a member of the British House of Commons representing first Evesham and then Bramber.

Biography

Early life 
Charles was the second son of Shuckburgh Boughton of Poston Court Hereford and Mary Greville (20 December 1713 – 1 March 1786),  daughter of Hon. Algernon Greville, and Hon. Mary Somerset, daughter of Lord Arthur Somerset (1671–1743), son of Henry Somerset, 1st Duke of Beaufort. He went to India as a writer in 1765 and held several judicial and administrative offices in the service of the East India Company. He was at various times a Persian interpreter and senior merchant and judge. During his time in India, he inherited an estate at Rouse Lench, Worcestershire by the will of Thomas Phillips Rouse.

He left the East India Company and after returning to England in 1778, stood for Parliament at Evesham in 1780, where he was elected as one of the members after a hard-fought battle. His main interest in politics was India, and the speeches which he made between 1780 and 1790 all dealt with Indian affairs. In 1784 he was appointed Secretary to the Board of Control for India and held the post until 1791. He opposed the impeachment of Warren Hastings.

Later life 
Charles did not contest the 1790 election and left Parliament. He assumed the name of Rouse by Royal Licence in 1791 and was created 1st Baronet Boughton Rouse. In 1794 he inherited the title 9th Baronet of Langford and changed his surname to Rouse Boughton.

At the general election in 1796 he was returned unopposed at Bramber, a notorious Rotten borough, where an agreement had operated since 1774, by which the two owners of the `miserable thatched cottages' who had the right to vote at Bramber returned a member each. In the new Parliament, he spoke several times on Indian affairs. He vacated his seat in 1800 when he was appointed an Audit Commissioner, a post he held until his death in 1821.

Family 

He married Catherine Pearce Hall, the daughter of William Pearce Hall and his wife Catherine Comyn, in 1781. Catherine was the heiress of the Downton estates near Ludlow, including Downton Hall. This was fortunate for Charles since his brother Edward had bequeathed the Boughton estates to Elisabeth Davis, his natural daughter by a serving maid, who later married baronet George Braithwaite. Catherine enhanced the estate at Downton, planting High Grove, or Catherine's Grove, and her portrait was painted by Romney in 1785. Charles was interested in agriculture and was renowned for his remarkable pig. In London, he lived at Corney House Chiswick.

Charles' son William inherited the baronetcy and his daughter Louise (1785 – 9 July 1860)  married firstly St Andrew St John, 14th Baron St John of Bletso  and secondly Sir John Vaughan.

In the programme Who Do You Think You Are? (transmitted on BBC2 on 23 August 2010), comedian Alexander Armstrong discovered that his mother is a descendant through Louise's first marriage to Baron St John.

References 

 Romney Sedgwick History of Parliament: the Commons – 1754–1790, HMSO
 R. G. Thorne History of Parliament: the Commons – 1790–1820, HMSO
 Oxford Dictionary of National Biography
 Burke's Peerage and Baronetage

External links 
 Shropshire Pig

1747 births
1821 deaths
Baronets in the Baronetage of England
Baronets in the Baronetage of Great Britain
Members of the Parliament of Great Britain for English constituencies
British East India Company people
British MPs 1780–1784
British MPs 1784–1790
British MPs 1796–1800
Politicians from Worcestershire
Civil servants in the Audit Office (United Kingdom)